Spor Toto Turkish Cup 2010–11 season was the 26th season of the TBF Men's Turkish Cup. Fenerbahçe Ülker won the cup this season, after it beat Beşiktaş Cola Turka 72–81 in the Final.

Group stage 
Group A and D matches played 10–12 October, group B and C matches played 9–11 October 2010.

Group A 
Group A matches played in Balıkesir.

Group B 
Group B matches played in Ordu.

Group C 
Group C matches played in Gaziantep.

Group D 
Group D matches played in Antalya.

Final 8 
All matches playing Eastern European Time.

Final 

Turkish Cup Basketball seasons
Cup